Discopolis is the sixth studio album by the Finnish rock group CMX.

With Discopolis, CMX took a different approach on recording with the goal of making the first entirely Pro Tools -based album in Finland. The basic concept was to build the songs from small pieces, emphasizing editing and production over playing and recording. The result was successful in sales, but received some negative critique in reviews.

Track listing
All songs written by CMX with lyrics by A. W. Yrjänä.

 "Discoinferno" – 3:43
 "Antroposentrifugi" – 3:11 ("Anthropocentrifuge")
 "Nimetön" – 3:35 ("Nameless")
 "Aamutähti" – 4:31 ("Morning Star")
 "Jerusalem" – 4:09
 "Vallat ja väet" – 4:21 ("The Powers and the Crowds")
 "Paha" – 2:21 ("Evil")
 "Suljettu astia" – 3:34 ("Closed Container")
 "Epäonnisten liikemiesten helvetti" – 3:23 ("The Hell of Unlucky Businessmen")
 "Arcana" – 5:18
 "Silmien ummistamisesta Nansenin galvanointiin" – 7:29 ("From the Closing of the Eyes to Galvanization of Nansen")

Personnel
 A. W. Yrjänä – vocals, bass
 Janne Halmkrona – guitar
 Timo Rasio – guitar
 Pekka Kanniainen – drums

Guests
 Gabi Hakanen – producing, recording, mixing and co-arrangements
 Teropekka Virtanen – recording and mixing
 Pauli Saastamoinen – mastering
 Ann Bell Fell – vocals
 Martti Salminen – keyboards on choir arrangement on #5
 Heikki Keskinen – brass arrangement on #4
 Risto Salmi – soprano saxophone and recorder
 Mikko Mustonen – trombone
 Matti Lappalainen – trombone
 Jukka Tiirikainen – keyed trumpet
 Tommi Viertonen – English horn
 Antero Priha – trumpet
 Kampin Laulu Choir
 Timo Lehtovaara – choir conductor
 Juha Laakso – choir recording

Singles
 "Nimetön" / "Seittemän Jeesusta" (October 1996) 
 "Aamutähti" / "Aamutähti (remix)" (October 1996)
 "Vallat ja väet" / "Riitti" (January 1997)

See also 
 CMX discography

References

CMX (band) albums
1996 albums